Radeon X800 is a series of graphics cards designed by ATI Technologies Inc. introduced in May of 2004.

History of Radeon X800 

The Radeon X800 series was designed to take the position X700 XT failed to secure, with 12 pipelines and a 256-bit RAM bus. The card surpassed the 6600GT with performance similar to that of the GeForce 6800. The new X800 XL, a similar product,  was positioned to dethrone NVIDIA's GeForce 6800 GT with higher memory speeds and a full 16 pipelines to boost performance. R430 was unable to reach high clock speeds, having been designed to reduce the cost per GPU, creating a need for new top-of-the-line core. The new high-end R4x0-generation arrived with the X850 series, equipped with various core tweaks for slightly higher performance than the "R420"-based X800 series. The "R480"-based X850 line was available in 3 forms: the X850 Pro, the X850 XT, and the X850 XT Platinum Edition, and was built on the reliable high-performance 130 nanometer Low-K process.

Radeon Feature Matrix

Radeon X800 series

AGP (X8xx)

 All models include AGP 8x
 All models include DirectX 9.0b and OpenGL 2.0

 1 Pixel shaders : Vertex shaders : Texture mapping units : Render output units

PCI-E (X8xx)

 All models include PCI-E x16, DirectX 9.0b and OpenGL 2.0

 1 Pixel shaders : Vertex shaders : Texture mapping units : Render output units

See also
 List of AMD graphics processing units
 Free and open-source device drivers: graphics#ATI.2FAMD

External links
 techPowerUp! GPU Database

ATI Technologies products
Graphics cards